Michel Koning (born 1 May 1984) is a Dutch tennis player. He has a career-high ATP singles ranking of world No. 229 achieved on 15 June 2009, and a career-high ATP doubles ranking of world No. 320 achieved on 18 August 2008.

As a junior, Koning reached a career high singles ranking of world No. 14, which he achieved on 8 July 2002 and a career-high doubles ranking of world No. 2, achieved on 9 September 2002. He won the 2002 US Open boys' doubles title alongside compatriot Bas Van Der Valk where they defeated Brian Baker and Chris Guccione in straight sets 6–4, 6–4.

Koning made his ATP Tour debut at the 2002 Ordina Open where he was given a wild card entry into the doubles draw alongside Bas Van Der Valk. They pulled off an upset victory by defeating fourth seeds Michael Hill and Daniel Vacek in the first round 6–7(8–10), 6–2, 7–6(7–5). They were defeated in the second round by Andrei Olhovskiy and David Adams in straight sets 3–6, 5–7. In June 2007, Koning made his ATP Tour singles debut when he prevailed through the qualifying rounds to reach the main draw of the 2007 Ordina Open played on grass courts in 's-Hertogenbosch. In qualifying he defeated Franko Skugor 7–5, 6–4, Philipp Petzschner 4–6, 7–6(7–5), 7–6(7–4) and Lukas Dlouhy 6–4, 7–6(7–3) to reach his first and what would become his only tour-level main draw. He would go on to lose in the first round to first seed Tommy Robredo in straight sets 4–6, 6–7(4–7).

Koning has reached 7 career singles finals, posting a tally of 5 wins and 2 losses, all coming on the ITF Futures Tour. Additionally, he has reached 19 career doubles finals with a record of 15 wins and 4 losses similarly all coming on the ITF Futures Tour.

ATP Challenger and ITF Futures finals

Singles: 7 (5–2)

Doubles: 19 (15–4)

Junior Grand Slam finals

Doubles: 1 (1 title)

References

External links

Official website Michel Koning

1984 births
Living people
Dutch male tennis players
US Open (tennis) junior champions
Grand Slam (tennis) champions in boys' doubles
People from Purmerend
Sportspeople from North Holland
21st-century Dutch people